Victor Kodelja (born November 26, 1951) is a former member of the Canadian national soccer team and North American Soccer League.

Professional
Prior to playing professionally, Kodelja played in the Pacific Coast Soccer League, playing at least the 1969–70 season with Columbus F.C.  In 1974, he signed with the Vancouver Whitecaps in the team's inaugural season in the league.  In 1976, he moved to the San Antonio Thunder.  At the end of the season, the team moved to Hawaii where it became Team Hawaii in 1977.  In 1978, he was back on the mainland with the San Jose Earthquakes; 1981 with the Calgary Boomers; 1982 and 1983 with the Toronto Blizzard; and 1984 with the Chicago Sting.  He remained with the Sting when the team moved to the Major Indoor Soccer League following the collapse of the NASL.

National team
Kodelja played eight times for Canada from 1974 through 1977. He debuted for the national team on 12 April 1974 in a scoreless draw versus Bermuda in Hamilton, Bermuda. His final cap came on 12 October 1977 in a 2–1 victory over Suriname in Mexico City, being replaced by Brian Budd at half time.

References

External links
 / Canada Soccer Hall of Fame
 NASL/MISL stats

1951 births
Living people
Sportspeople from the Province of Caserta
Association football forwards
Calgary Boomers players
Canadian expatriate sportspeople in the United States
Canadian expatriate soccer players
Canada men's international soccer players
Canadian soccer players
Chicago Sting (MISL) players
Chicago Sting (NASL) players
Italian emigrants to Canada
Major Indoor Soccer League (1978–1992) players
North American Soccer League (1968–1984) indoor players
Naturalized citizens of Canada
North American Soccer League (1968–1984) players
San Antonio Thunder players
San Jose Earthquakes (1974–1988) players
Soccer people from British Columbia
Team Hawaii players
Toronto Blizzard (1971–1984) players
Vancouver Columbus players
Vancouver Whitecaps (1974–1984) players
People of Campanian descent
Footballers from Campania